Robert Joseph Farnon CM (24 July 191723 April 2005) was a Canadian-born composer, conductor, musical arranger and trumpet player. As well as being a composer of original works (often in the light music genre), he was commissioned by film and television producers for theme and incidental music. In later life he composed a number of more serious orchestral works, including three symphonies, and was recognised with four Ivor Novello awards and the Order of Canada.

Life
Born in Toronto, he was commissioned as a captain in the Canadian Army and became the conductor/arranger of the Canadian Band of the Supreme Headquarters Allied Expeditionary Force sent overseas during World War II, which was the Canadian equivalent of the American Band of the SHAEF led by Major Glenn Miller. He was noted as a jazz trumpeter–his longtime friend Dizzy Gillespie once stated that he was pleased that Farnon took up composing, arranging and conducting, because Robert was the better jazz trumpeter.

He married Joanne Dallas, a singer from the SHAEF band, whom he later divorced. At the end of the war Farnon decided to make England his home, and he later moved to Guernsey in the Channel Islands with his new wife Patricia Smith and his five children. His friend and fellow composer Wally Stott composed "A Canadian in Mayfair" as a tribute.

He was considered by his peers to be the finest arranger in the world, and his talents influenced many composer-arrangers, including Quincy Jones, all of whom acknowledged his contributions to their work. Conductor André Previn called him "the greatest writer for strings in the world."  He was the musical director and conductor for Tony Bennett's 1972 series for Thames Television, Tony Bennett at the Talk of the Town.

He won four Ivor Novello Awards, including one for "Outstanding Services to British Music" in 1991, and in 1996 he won the Grammy Award for Best Instrumental Arrangement for "Lament" performed by J. J. Johnson & his Robert Farnon Orchestra. He was also awarded the Order of Canada early in 1998.

Robert Farnon died at the age of 87, at a hospice near his home of 40 years in Guernsey. He was survived by his wife Patricia and their five children, as well as two children from his previous marriage and his many grandchildren. Farnon's older brother Brian and his younger brother Dennis were also orchestral composers, arrangers and conductors.

Works
Farnon is probably best known for two famous pieces of light music, "Jumping Bean" and "Portrait of a Flirt", which were originally released in 1955 as the A and B sides on the same 78, and for "Westminster Waltz", and "A Star is Born".

Farnon also wrote the music for more than forty motion pictures, including Captain Horatio Hornblower R.N. (1951), Gentlemen Marry Brunettes (1955), The Road to Hong Kong (1962), The Prisoner (1967-68), Shalako (1968) and Bear Island (1979). He wrote the theme tune and other music for many, mostly British,  television series including Colditz (1972–74), Secret Army (1977–79), Kessler (1981), and A Man Called Intrepid (1979). His score for the first episode of the spy-fi series The Champions (1968) was released on CD by Network DVD in 2009.

From the early 1960s, Farnon was a prominent orchestral arranger for vocalists. He arranged and conducted Frank Sinatra's only album recorded outside of the United States, Sinatra Sings Great Songs from Great Britain (1962), in London. Farnon also arranged and conducted Lena Horne's album Lena: A New Album (1976), Tony Bennett's Christmas album Snowfall (1968), and one of Sarah Vaughan's albums recorded in Denmark, Vaughan with Voices (1964).

He also completed three full-length classical symphonies, a concerto for piano and orchestra called Cascades to the Sea, a rhapsody for violin and orchestra and a concerto for bassoon; he was commissioned to compose the test piece for the 1975 Brass Band Championships of Great Britain finals held at the Albert Hall and constructed Un Vie de Matelot (A Sailor's Life), a set of variations based on an original theme.

The last piece he composed was entitled The Gaels: An American Wind Symphony, as a commission for the Roxbury High School band in honour of the school's mascot, the gael. The piece had its world premiere in May 2006. It was performed by the Roxbury High School Honors Wind Symphony under the direction of Dr. Stanley Saunders, a close friend of Farnon.

His 1954 piece, "Derby Day", was used for Rádio e Televisão de Portugal television services when they commenced on 7 March 1957. It became one of the station's anthems.

Selected filmography

See also 

 Music of Canada
 List of Canadian composers

References

Further reading

Articles

"A Hit With Morning Listeners". The Vancouver Sun. 24 November 1937.
"There Are Smiles". The Youngstown-Alberta Plaindealer. 28 April 1938.
"Getting Into a Happy Frame of Mind". The Vancouver Sun. 16 May 1938.
"The 'Happy Gang' broadcasts Monday at 11". Saskatoon Star-Phoenix. 30 August 1941.
"Canada's most famous fun-makers coming to Windsor". The Windsor Star. 23 May 1942.
"Another New Network Show on CFCN; "the Voice of Victor" feat.'Bob' Farnon's Orchestra". Calgary Herald. 29 October 1942.
"Happy Gang's Fan Mail Largest in Canada". The Coaticook Observer. 5 January 1940.
"The Happy Gang". The Ottawa Citizen. 5 May 1942. (Drag image down to access adjoining photo.)
Canadian Press. "No More Stories of Bob's 'Gram'". The Ottawa Citizen. 8 May 1942.
Cowan, Cal. "Program Reviews: 'The Voice of Victor'". Billboard. 5 December 1942.
"Tunefulness Of Musical Score One Big Hit In the Army Show". The Ottawa Citizen. 8 May 1943.
Reuters. "Robert Farnon Denies Peace Group's Position". The Montreal Gazette. 22 June 1951.
Canadian Press. "Aiming at Early Retirement, Farnon Plans Composer Role". The Ottawa Citizen. 31 October 1955.
Lees, Gene. "Afterthoughts". Downbeat. 16 February 1961. (Reproduced following 9-paragraph remembrance of Lees posted 26 May 2014 by the Robert Farnon Society.)
"Radio-TV: Trumpeter Dizzy Gillespie On Ed Sullivan Show". Jet. 4 May 1961.
"CBC Is Celebrating Its 25th Anniversary" (Captioned photo). The Ottawa Citizen. 14 November 1961. (Drag image up to read caption.)
Gleason, Ralph. "Rhythm Section: Satch Will Take a Year Off to Rest His Chops - and Listen; Liner Notes". The Milwaukee Journal. 3 March 1962.
Tomkins, Les. . National Jazz Archive. 1967.
Tomkins, Les. . National Jazz Archive. 1967.
Forester. "Sparkling 'Porgy'". The Age. 26 October 1967.
Radcliffe, Joe. "Talent in Action: Tony Bennett". Billboard. 23 October 1971.
Siskind, Jacob. "NACO Delivers Rich Sound Under Farnon Baton". The Ottawa Citizen. 15 January 1983.
Shaw, Peter. "Canada's Arranger for the Stars". The Ottawa Citizen. 31 March 1984.
McDonald, Tim. "Robert Farnon: Prolific light music composer famed for film and television themes". The Guardian. 25 April 2005.
Oliver, Myrna. "Robert Farnon, 87; Composer and Arranger for Movies, Pop and Jazz". The Los Angeles Times. 27 April 2005.
Riley, John. "Robert Farnon: Composer of film scores and popular song". The Independent. 14 May 2005.
Cerra, Steven A. "Jazz Profiles - Robert Farnon: An Arranger’s Arranger". Blogspot. 31 December 2011.
Sultanof, Jeff. "Robert Farnon, Part 1". ArtsJournal. 5 February 2013.
Sultanof, Jeff. "Robert Farnon, Part 2". ArtsJournal. 6 February 2013.

Books

Perito, Nick (2004). "Hello, Danny!". I Just Happened to Be There: Making Music With the Stars. Philadelphia: Xlibris Corp. pp. 138–139. .
Barrett, Joshua; Bourgeois III, Louis G. (2005). "Why Indianapolis - Why Not Indianapolis?!". The Musical World of J.J. Johnson. Lanham: Scarecrow Press. pp. 213–216. .

External links
 Robert Farnon Society
 
 "Robert Farnon" thecanadianencyclopedia.ca
 "Robert Farnon" 2nd article at thecanadianencyclopedia.ca
 Robert Farnon - Northern Stars
 

1917 births
2005 deaths
Members of the Order of Canada
Canadian male composers
Canadian conductors (music)
Male conductors (music)
Canadian film score composers
British male film score composers
Canadian music arrangers
British composers
British male conductors (music)
Easy listening musicians
Grammy Award winners
Light music composers
Musicians from Toronto
Jazz arrangers
Canadian emigrants to the United Kingdom
Canadian military musicians
20th-century Canadian composers
British film score composers
British music arrangers
20th-century British conductors (music)
20th-century Canadian male musicians
Canadian male jazz musicians
Canadian Army officers
Canadian Army personnel of World War II
Military personnel from Toronto